Jacopo Silvestri (15th century – 16th century) was an Italian cryptographer and author.

He was born in Florence. The limited information on his life comes from what he wrote about himself in his work, the Opus novum ("New work"), considered the second printed work about cryptography.

Works

References 

 

Italian cryptographers
16th-century deaths
15th-century births